Jason Nevins (born December 15, 1972) is an American songwriter, record producer and remixer, who is most widely known for his pop and dance productions, including his multi-platinum, multi-million selling production of "It's Like That" by American hip hop group Run–D.M.C. and his multi-million selling production of "Cruise" by Florida Georgia Line featuring Nelly.

Career
In the 1990s, Nevins began releasing singles under various monikers through every big underground dance label, but achieved global recognition in 1998 with his remix production of Run–D.M.C.'s "It's Like That" which was released under the title 'Run–DMC vs. Jason Nevins', reaching number-one on the pop chart in over 30 countries, with close to 5 million worldwide sales and over 1 million in sales in both Germany and the United Kingdom. In the UK, the single also halted the Spice Girls' (then record) run of six consecutive number ones with their first six singles, holding the Spice Girls' seventh release, "Stop", at number 2.  "It's Like That" was the third highest selling single of 1998 in the UK behind "Believe" by Cher and "My Heart Will Go On" by Celine Dion. 

In 1998, Nevins won an RTL television number-one single award for the TV series Top of the Pops. The same year he also won a Comet Award for the number-one dance act.

Nevins followed up "It's Like That" with a string of hip house remixes, with Run–D.M.C.'s "It's Tricky", 2 Live Crew's "We Want Some P&%$#!", Insane Clown Posse's "Hokus Pokus", Cypress Hill's "Insane in the Brain"; all featuring on his 1999 Sony album, Uni-Vs-Al (Universal). In 2001, he continued the "dance-rock sound" by adding big beat and rock influences to his remixes and productions, working on tracks for artists as varied as N.E.R.D, Duran Duran and the Bloodhound Gang. Nevins has also revisited producing his own work, with a release on the UK based Sanctuary Records, entitled The Funk Rocker, in October 2004, and reached top 5 airplay in Europe with his pseudonym, UKNY, with the track "I'm in Heaven", featuring vocals by Holly James. "Heaven" went to number 9 on the UK Singles chart. Also off the Sanctuary album, I'm the Main Man, which featured parts from T-Rex's Marc Bolan landed a Coors Light Beer ad throughout the UK and Ireland. Coors launched the massive ad campaign using Nevins' track as the featured music for their commercial and campaign. In 2007, Nevins collaborated with Dannii Minogue on "Touch Me Like That", with a video being shot at the legendary Pinewood Studios in London.

Over the years, Nevins has had numerous songs, productions and remixes of his used in films, television advertisements and video games. Jason has had 37 top 10 remixes and productions in the Billboard charts. In 2012, Nevins produced and co-wrote "I Believe in This Life" with Marius Moga (who has a song with Maroon 5) and Greg Holden (who wrote the hit song "Home" for Phillip Phillips)—a U.S. single for Jermaine Paul, the winner of the second season of the massively popular TV show The Voice on NBC. The song was used in a commercial for the Samsung Galaxy and their "Next Big Thing" campaign also featuring Blake Shelton.

In 2013, Nevins produced the top 40 version for the American country group Florida Georgia Line's hit single "Cruise" featuring American singer/rapper Nelly. His idea of adding Nelly to the record also helped propel it to the top of the charts. The song peaked at number 2 on iTunes and at number 4 on the Billboard Hot 100 and has amassed over 2.5 million in sales.

In 2013, Nevins, along with Florida Georgia Line and Nelly won the award for Song of the Year at the American Musics Award for the remix of "Cruise".

In 2013, Nevins produced the main version of Ariana Grande and Mika's "Popular Song", which was certified gold in the US by the RIAA (500,0000 copies). Nevins was hired by Rich Issacson, Mika's manager and Republic Records. The official YouTube video has reached 185 million views.

In 2014, Nevins, along with Florida Georgia Line and Nelly were nominated for Vocal Event of the Year at the 2014 Academy of Country Music Awards.

On November 10, 2016, Nevins' remix of Nelly's "Work It" was played at the Golden State Warriors basketball game and became part of the viral video clip of Robin Schreiber dancing in the stands. The mega-viral video has achieved 130 million views.

Discography

Albums (as artist)
 Red/Green CD (1993)
 Uni-Vs-Al (Universal) (2000)
 Pushing It Hard (2003)
 The Funk Rocker (2005)
 Pushing It Harder: The Lost Tapes (2006)

Charted singles

Productions and songwriting highlights
Run-DMC vs. Jason Nevins "It's Like That" (Smile/Profile/Sony) [Producer / Mixer]
Florida Georgia Line featuring Nelly "Cruise" (Republic Nashville) [Producer of Nelly version/ Mixer]
Mika featuring Ariana Grande – "Popular Song" (Universal Republic) [Producer/ Mixer]
Amy Weber, Jason Nevins & Sean Kingston – "Dance of Life (Come Alive)" [Producer, Co-Writer and Mixer]
Joel Crouse – "That's Why God Made Love Songs" (Showdog/ Universal) [Additional Production/ Arrangement] 
Jermaine Paul – "I Believe in This Life" (Universal Republic) [Producer and Co-Writer]
Vicci Martinez – "I Can Love" (Universal Republic) [Producer, Co-writer and Mixer]
Vicci Martinez – "Hold Me Darlin'" (Universal Republic) [Producer, Co-Writer and Mixer]
Runner Runner – "Unstoppable" (Capitol/ Worldwide Pants) [Co-Writer]
Myname – "We Made It" (Digz Japan) [Co-Writer]
Duran Duran – "(Reach Up for the) Sunrise" – additional production on the album version [Additional Production /Mixer]
Chemistry – "Yoake-Dawn" (Sony Music Japan) [Co-Writer]
Jason Nevins featuring Greg Nice – "Candyman" (Ultra) [Producer, Co-writer and Mixer]
Jason Nevins – "Open Ur Mind" (Ultra) [Producer, Co-Writer and Mixer]
Jason Nevins vs. Dannii Minogue – "Touch Me Like That" (AATW) [Producer, Co-Writer and Mixer]
Jason Nevins featuring Holly James – "I'm in Heaven" (Nevco) (Free2Air/Edel- deal ended) [Writer, Producer and Mixer]
Jason Nevins vs. Liroy – "Scyzoryk" (BMG) [Producer and Mixer]

DJ mixed compilations
 Club Mix USA (Tycoon Records/Sony Music Canada, 2002)
 Virgin Records Dance Hits (Virgin Records, 2004)
 High School Musical 2: Non-Stop Dance Party (Disney Records, 2007) – remixed entire album and DJ mixed
 Dance Anthems 2 (Thrive Records, 2008)
 Ultra.Dance, Vol. 10 (Ultra Music, 2009)
 Ultra Weekend 5 (Ultra Music, 2009)
 Jersey Shore Soundtrack (Universal Republic, 2010)

References

External links

αCharts.us entry

1972 births
Living people
Remixers
Record producers from California